O'Brien Electric Priming Company is a historic industrial building located at South Bend, St. Joseph County, Indiana.  It consists of four sections built between 1882 and 1917.  The building housed the O'Brien Corporation, a paint manufacturer.

It was listed on the National Register of Historic Places in 1983.

References

External links
O'Brien Varnish Company

Industrial buildings and structures on the National Register of Historic Places in Indiana
Industrial buildings completed in 1882
Buildings and structures in South Bend, Indiana
National Register of Historic Places in St. Joseph County, Indiana
1882 establishments in Indiana